The Flight into Egypt in a Boat is a 1764–1770 oil on canvas painting by Giovanni Battista Tiepolo, a variation on the Flight into Egypt theme featuring a boat rather than the more usual donkey. The two swans beside the boat are symbols of marital fidelity. It is now at the Museu Nacional de Arte Antiga in Lisbon.

Description 
The painting is a variation of the theme of the flight into Egypt made by the Holy Family: here in fact the usual donkey does not appear but in its place there is a boat, on which are Joseph, Mary and Jesus. The boat is guided with touches delicate by three angels, who are preparing to land on the Egyptian coasts. In the water we see two swans which are the allegory of marital fidelity.

Exhibitions 
This painting was shown to the public in Paris, at the Dazzling Venice! Venice, the arts and Europe in the 18th century at the Grand Palais, from September 26, 2018 to January 21, 2019.

References

1760s paintings
Paintings by Giovanni Battista Tiepolo
Paintings depicting the Flight into Egypt
Paintings in the collection of the National Museum of Ancient Art
Birds in art
Maritime paintings